This is the list of Southeast Asian Games medalists in table tennis from 1959 to present.

Medalists from SEA Games 1959-1971, 1975-1979 & 1985-1995 are incomplete.

Results

Men's singles

Men's doubles

Men's team
1959 gold : south vietnam

Women's singles

Women's doubles

Women's team

Mixed doubles

See also
Table tennis at the Asian Games
List of Asian Games medalists in table tennis

References